Samuel William Honaker (March 14, 1887 – March 21, 1966) was an American football player and coach and consul general.

Early years
Honaker was born in Tampa, Florida in 1887 but grew up in Plano, Texas. He spent two years at Bingham Preparatory School in Asheville, North Carolina and five at the University of Virginia.

University of Virginia
He graduated from UVA in 1913.

Football
Honaker was a quarterback for the Virginia Cavaliers of the University of Virginia, remembered as one of its "great" ones; "a diminutive quarterback who thrilled the crowds with his brilliant broken-field running."

1907
"A well known New York authority on sports" selected Honaker for his All-Southern team in 1907. Walter Camp gave him honorable mention on his All-America teams.

1908
The Cavaliers won a Southern title in 1908.

1909
Virginia won a share of another title in 1909. Honaker was captain of the '09 team. Kemper Yancey was a teammate.

Coaching career
He was the head college football coach for the University of Richmond Spiders located in Richmond, Virginia for the 1911 season. His career coaching record at Richmond was 0 wins, 6 losses, and 2 ties.

Consul general
Honaker later joined the United States Foreign Service, serving as consul general in Istanbul, Turkey at one point. He was also the consul general in Stuttgart, Germany in 1935.

Head coaching record

References

1887 births
1966 deaths
American football quarterbacks
Richmond Spiders football coaches
Virginia Cavaliers football players
All-Southern college football players
Sportspeople from Plano, Texas
Players of American football from Tampa, Florida
Coaches of American football from Florida